Saint Crescentian (died 130 AD) was a 2nd-century Christian martyr killed at Sassyr, on Sardinia. Saints Gabinus and Crispulis were killed at the same time.

References

130 deaths
Saints from Roman Italy
2nd-century Christian martyrs
Year of birth unknown